Edith Grey Wheelwright (1868 – 24 September 1949) was a British writer and botanist. She served as Secretary to the Bath Branch of the National Union of Women’s Suffrage Societies (NUWSS) from 1909 through 1913.

Biography

Wheelwright was born in 1868 in Crowhurst, Surrey. She studied botany and geology at Oxford.

She was the author of three novels; The Vengeance of Medea (1894), Anthony Graeme  (1895), and A Slow Awakening (1902). Additionally she wrote for the publications Girl’s Own Paper and Great Thoughts. In her later years she wrote five books on the subject of medicinal plants and gardening. She began a friendship with Beatrix Potter because of their mutual interest in plants.

Wheelwright initially became involved with the British suffragette movement through the Women’s Social and Political Union WSPU, but left because she preferred the non-militant stance of the National Union of Women’s Suffrage Societies. She was secretary of the Bath Branch of the NUWSS 1909 through 1913.

Wheelwright died on 24 September 1949 in Clevedon from accidental coal gas poisoning.

References

Further reading
"Medicinal Plants and Their History" by Edith Grey Wheelwright 

1868 births
1949 deaths
British women's rights activists
English suffragettes
Women's Social and Political Union